Bergur Midjord (born 20 April 1985 in Tórshavn), Faroe Islands is a midfielder that plays for B36 Tórshavn.

External links
 

1985 births
Living people
People from Tórshavn
Faroe Islands international footballers
Association football midfielders
B36 Tórshavn players
Faroese footballers